Vladimir Cosma (born 13 April 1940) is a Romanian composer, conductor and violinist.

He was born into a family of musicians. His father, Teodor Cosma, was a pianist and conductor, his mother a writer-composer, his uncle, Edgar Cosma, composer and conductor, and one of his grandmothers, pianist, a student of the renowned Ferruccio Busoni.

Career
After receiving first prizes for violin and composition at the Bucharest Conservatoire of Music, he arrived in Paris in 1963 and continued his studies at the Conservatoire national supérieur de musique de Paris, working with Nadia Boulanger. As well as for classical music, he discovered early on a passion for jazz, film music and all forms of popular music.

From 1964 he made a number of international tours as a concert violinist and began to devote himself more and more to composing. He wrote various compositions including: Trois mouvements d'été for symphony orchestra, Oblique for violoncello and string orchestra, music for theatre and ballet (Volpone for the Comédie Française, the opera Fantômas...).

In 1968, Yves Robert entrusted him with his first film music for Alexandre le Bienheureux.

Vladimir Cosma has since composed more than three  hundred scores for feature films and TV series. His numerous successes in the cinema have notably been in collaboration with Yves Robert, Gérard Oury, Francis Veber, Claude Pinoteau, Jean-Jacques Beineix, Claude Zidi, Ettore Scola, Pascal Thomas, Pierre Richard, Yves Boisset, André Cayatte, Jean-Pierre Mocky, Edouard Molinaro, Jean-Marie Poiré... and among which: 
Le Grand Blond avec une chaussure noire, Diva, Les Aventures de Rabbi Jacob, La Boum, le Bal, l'As des As, la Chèvre, Les Fugitifs, Les Zozos, Pleure pas la bouche pleine, Dupont Lajoie, Un éléphant ça trompe énormément, La Dérobade, Le Père Noël est une ordure, L'Étudiante, La Gloire de mon père, Le Château de ma mère, Le dîner de cons ...

Vladimir Cosma also featured in major French and American television productions:
, Kidnapped, Mistral's Daughter, Châteauvallon, Les Mystères de Paris, Les Cœurs Brûlés...

Film music allowed him to approach and develop many different musical styles: jazz (with music written for famous soloists such as Chet Baker, Toots Thielemans, Don Byas, Stéphane Grappelli, Jean-Luc Ponty, Philip Catherine, Tony Coe, Pepper Adams, la chanson (pour Nana Mouskouri, Marie Laforêt, Richard Sanderson, Diane Dufresne, Herbert Léonard, Mireille Mathieu, Nicole Croisille, Lara Fabian, Guy Marchand), original compositions inspired by folk-music (for Gheorghe Zamfir, Stanciu Simion Syrinx, pan-flute,  Liam O'Flynn- pipes, Romane-guitar), as well as classical music (Berlin Concerto for violin and orchestra, Concerto for Euphonium and orchestra, Concerto Ibérique for trumpet and orchestra, Courts Métrages for brass quintet...)

In 2006 he conducted the world premier of his composition Eh bien ! Dansez maintenant, divertissement for narrator and symphony orchestra, from the Fables of Jean de la Fontaine, at the Victoria Hall in Geneva, with the Orchestre de la Suisse Romande and Lambert Wilson as narrator. Conducting the  Orchestre National de France he gave a first performance in Paris of this work in December 2010 at the Théâtre des Champs-Elysées, featuring Eric Génovèse of the Comédie Française.

Vladimir Cosma wrote the opera "Marius et Fanny", adapted from Marcel Pagnol, for which the first production took place in September 2007 at the Opéra de Marseille with Roberto Alagna and Angela Gheorghiu in the title roles, as well as Jean-Philippe Lafont in the role of César. The performances were repeated several times on television on the channels ARTE and FR3.

In 2008 he composed the music for the musical comedy  performed at the Palais des Congrès in Paris, with Eric Metayer, Marianne James, Spike, Julie Victor...

In June 2009, Vladimir Cosma conducted the world premiere in the Eglise Sainte-Madeleine de Béziers, of his cantata 1209, for soprano, narrator, children's choir and orchestra, written especially for the 8th centenary of the Sac de Béziers.

He is dedicated to re-writing his film music with the intention of conducting performances in symphonic concerts, thus approaching a wider audience than at the cinema . Among others, he gave a concert in Geneva  in 2003 with the Orchestre de la Suisse Romande, a series of concerts in 2003 with the Orchestre National de Lyon, three concerts in 2005 in Paris at the Grand Rex, a concert in 2010 with the Orchestre de l'Ile-de-France in the Théâtre du Châtelet in Paris. 
 
He has also appeared in many countries with major symphony orchestras and such prestigious soloists as Ivry Gitlis, Vadim Repin, Wilhelmenia Fernandez, Patrice Fontanarosa, Jean-Luc Ponty, Didier Lockwood, [[Stanciu Simion Syrinx»]], Philip Catherine and others.
A book of interviews with Vincent Perrot entitled Vladimir Cosma comme au cinéma was published in 2009 in the Editions Hors Collection and an anthology of his film music regrouping 91 complete original soundtracks in two volumes has just come out.
Two evenings were devoted to him by the French TV channel, France 3 in 2010, airing his concert at the Théâtre du Châtelet and a documentary Vladimir Cosma intime.

Vladimir Cosma  received two Césars for the best movie score, for Diva (1982) and Le Bal (1984), two Golden Sevens for the best music for television, as well as a number of prizes and awards in France and other countries.
He has also obtained numerous gold and platinum records all over the world (France, Germany, Japan, England, Switzerland, Belgium, Italy, the Netherlands, Scandinavia).
Vladimir Cosma is Chevalier de l'ordre National la Légion d'Honneur,  Grand Officier du Mérite Culturel Roumain,  as well as Commandeur des Arts et des Lettres.

 Works 
 Film soundtracks 
 1960s 
1966 : Le Plus Vieux Métier du monde de Jean-Luc Godard, Claude Autant-Lara, Philippe de Broca... – Film à sketches - Musique de Michel Legrand et Vladimir Cosma.
1966 : Oum le dauphin blanc (Dessins animés – 52 épisodes) Musique co-composée avec Michel Legrand – arrangements et direction d'orchestre.
1967 : But de Dominique Delouche – court métrage
1967 : Du mou dans la gâchette de Louis Grospierre – arrangements
1967 : L'Homme à la Buick de Gilles Grangier – arrangements
1968 : Alexandre le bienheureux de Yves Robert
1968 : Maldonne de Sergio Gobbi
1968 : Les Prisonniers de la liberté (Prisoners of freedom – Aserei Hahofesh) de Yona Zaretsky
1968 : Sayarim de Micha Shagrir – arrangements et direction d'orchestre
1968 : Pour un amour lointain d'Edmond Séchan – arrangements et direction d'orchestre
1969 : Clérambard de Yves Robert
1969 : Appelez-moi Mathilde de Pierre Mondy – arrangements et direction d'orchestre
1969 : Le Miroir de la terre d'Edmond Séchan - court métrage
1969 :  de Wolfgang Liebeneiner – série TV

 1970s 
1970 : Le Distrait de Pierre Richard
1970 : Térésa de Gérard Vergez
1970 : Caïn de nulle part de Daniel Daërt
1971 : Les Malheurs d'Alfred de Pierre Richard
1971 : Tang de André Michel – série TV, 13 x 26'
1972 : Le Grand Blond avec une chaussure noire de Yves Robert
1972 : Les Zozos de Pascal Thomas
1972 : Les Félines de Daniel Daërt
1972 : Neither by Day Nor by Night (Lo B'Yom V'Lo B'Layla) de Steven Hilliard Stern
1973 : L'Affaire Crazy Capo de Patrick Jamain
1973 : Pleure pas la bouche pleine de Pascal Thomas
1973 : La dernière bourrée à Paris de Raoul André
1973 : Les Grands Sentiments font les bons gueuletons de Michel Berny
1973 : Salut l'artiste de Yves Robert
1973 : La Raison du plus fou de François Reichenbach avec Raymond Devos
1973 : Les Aventures de Rabbi Jacob de Gérard Oury
1973 : Le Dingue de Daniel Daërt
1973 : Les Grands Détectives série TV 6x52' de Jacques Nahum, Jean-Pierre Decourt, Jean Herman, Alexandre Astruc, etc.... -
1973 : La Main enchantée de Michel Subiela – téléfilm
1974 : La Rivale de Sergio Gobbi
1974 : Le Chaud Lapin de Pascal Thomas
1974 : La Moutarde me monte au nez de Claude Zidi
1974 : La Gueule de l'emploi de Jacques Rouland
1974 : Le Retour du Grand Blond de Yves Robert
1974 : La Virée superbe de Gérard Vergez
1975 : Dupont Lajoie de Yves Boisset
1975 : La Course à l'échalote de Claude Zidi
1975 : Catherine et Cie de Michel Boisrond
1975 : Le Faux-cul de Roger Hanin
1975 : Le Téléphone Rose de Edouard Molinaro
1975 : Adios de André Michel – mini-série TV, 3 x 90'
1975 : Hugues-le-Loup de Michel Subiela - téléfilm
1975 : TF1 (Indicatif de la chaîne et du journal télévisé.)
1975 : Cinéma du Dimanche (Indicatif)
1976 : Les Œufs brouillés de Joël Santoni
1976 : La Surprise du chef de Pascal Thomas
1976 : Le Jouet de Francis Veber
1976 : Un éléphant ça trompe énormément d'Yves Robert
1976 : Dracula père et fils d'Edouard Molinaro
1976 : L'Aile ou la Cuisse de Claude Zidi
1976 : A chacun son enfer - Autopsie d'un monstre d'André Cayatte
1976 : Michel Strogoff de Jean-Pierre Decourt - série TV, 7 x 55'
1976 : Le Collectionneur de cerveaux - Les Robots pensants de Michel Subiela- téléfilm
1976 : L'Assassinat de Concino Concini de Gérard Vergez - téléfilm
1976 : Les Mystères de Loudun de Gérard Vergez - téléfilm
1976 : Silence ...on tourne de Roger Coggio
1977 : Le Chien de Monsieur Michel de Jean-Jacques Beineix - court métrage
1977 : Nous irons tous au paradis d'Yves Robert
1977 : Un Oursin dans la poche de Pascal Thomas
1977 : Animal de Claude Zidi
1977 : Vous n'aurez pas l'Alsace et la Lorraine de Coluche
1977 : La Mer promise de Jacques Ertaud - téléfilm
1977 : Les Confessions d'un enfant de Cœur de Jean L'Hôte - téléfilm
1977 : Vaincre à Olympie de Michel Subiela - téléfilm
1977 : Les Filles de Malemort de Daniel Daërt
1977 : Où vont les poissons rouges ? de André Michel - téléfilm
1977 : Richelieu de Jean-Pierre Decourt - série TV, 6 x 52'
1977 : Enquête posthume sur un vaisseau fantôme de Michel Subiela - téléfilm
1977 : Les Jeunes Filles de Lazare Iglesis – mini-série TV, 2 x 90'
1977 : Le Loup blanc de Jean-Pierre Decourt – mini-série TV, 3 x 55'
1977 : L'Affaire des poisons de Gérard Vergez - téléfilm
1978 : La Zizanie de Claude Zidi
1978 : La Raison d'Etat d'André Cayatte
1978 : Je suis timide... mais je me soigne de Pierre Richard
1978 : Cause toujours... tu m'intéresses ! d'Edouard Molinaro
1978 : Confidences pour confidences de Pascal Thomas
1978 : L'Enlèvement du Régent - Le Chevalier d'Harmental de Gérard Vergez- téléfilm
1978 :  - Episode n°1 : Le Dossier Françoise Muller d'Edouard Molinaro - TV
1978 : Les Grandes Conjurations – Episode : Le Connétable de Bourbon de Jean-Pierre Decourt - TV
1978 : Histoires insolites. Episode 1 : La Stratégie du serpent d'Yves Boisset - TV
1978 : Plein les poches pour pas un rond de Daniel Daërt
1978 : L'Equipage d'André Michel - téléfilm
1978 : Médecins de nuit de Nicolas Ribowski, Bruno Gantillon, Jean-Pierre Prévost, Philippe Lefèbvre, Peter Kassovitz... - 6 séries TV, 44 x 55'
1979 : La Dérobade de Daniel Duval
1979 : Courage - Let's Run d'Yves Robert
1979 : C'est pas moi c'est lui de Pierre Richard
1979 : Ils sont grands ces petits de Joël Santoni
1979 : Histoires de voyous : Les Marloupins de Michel Berny - TV
1979 : Histoires de voyous : La Belle Affaire de Louis Grospierre - TV
1979 : La Servante de Lazare Iglesis – téléfilm
1979 : La Belle vie de Lazare Iglesis – téléfilm
1979 : Duos sur canapé de Marc Camoletti
1979 : Les Aventures de David Balfour de Jean-Pierre Decourt - série TV, 6 x 55'
1979 : La Fabrique, un conte de Noël de Pascal Thomas - téléfilm
1979 : Le Baiser au lépreux d'André Michel – téléfilm
1979 : Sam et Sally de Nicolas Ribowski, Jean Girault, Robert Pouret et Joël Séria -1ère série TV, 6 x 55'
1979 : Sam et Sally de Joël Santoni - 2ème série TV, 6 x 55'

 1980s 
1980 : La Femme enfant - L'Ombre du loup de Raphaële Billetdoux
1980 : Inspecteur la Bavure de Claude Zidi
1980 : Diva de Jean-Jacques Beineix - César de la meilleure musique de film
1980 : Le Bar du téléphone de Claude Barrois
1980 : La Boum de Claude Pinoteau
1980 : Celles qu'on a pas eues de Pascal Thomas
1980 : Le Coup du parapluie de Gérard Oury
1980 : Laat de Dokter maar schuiven de Nikolai van der Heyde
1980 : L'Antichambre de Michel Bienvenu - court métrage
1980 : Petit déjeuner compris de Michel Berny - série TV, 6 x 52'
1980 : Les Mystères de Paris d'André Michel - série TV, 6 x 52'
1980 : Les Roses de Dublin de Lazare Iglesis - série TV, 6 x 52'
1980 : Les Maîtres sonneurs de Lazare Iglesis - téléfilm
1981 : Les Sous-doués en vacances de Claude Zidi
1981 : Une Affaire d'hommes de Nicolas Ribowski
1981 : Pourquoi pas nous ? de Michel Berny
1981 : La Chèvre de Francis Veber
1981 : L'Année prochaine... si tout va bien de Jean-Loup Hubert
1981 : La Grande Pitié du Comte de Gruyère de Lazare Iglesis - téléfilm
1981 : La Double vie de Théophraste Longuet de Yannick Andreï - mini-série TV, 3 x 90'
1981 : La Vie des autres - L'Ascension de Catherine Sarrazin de Jean-Pierre Prévost – téléfilm
1981 : Pollufission 2000 de Jean-Pierre Prévost - téléfilm
1981 : La Guerre des insectes de Peter Kassovitz - téléfilm
1982 : Jamais avant le mariage de Daniel Ceccaldi
1982 : Le Père Noël est une ordure de Jean-Marie Poiré
1982 : La Boum 2 de Claude Pinoteau
1982 : Tout le monde peut se tromper de Jean Couturier
1982 : L'As des as de Gérard Oury
1982 : L'Adieu aux As de Jean-Pierre Decourt - série TV, 6 x 52'
1982 : Les Dames à la licorne de Lazare Iglesis – mini-série, 2 x 90'
1982 : La Veuve rouge d'Edouard Molinaro – mini-série, 2 x 90'
1982 : Un Adolescent d'autrefois d'André Michel - téléfilm
1983 : Le Bal d'Ettore Scola. César de la meilleure musique
1983 : Le Prix du danger d'Yves Boisset
1983 : Banzaï de Claude Zidi
1983 : Les Compères de Francis Veber
1983 : P'tit Con de Gérard Lauzier
1983 : L'Etincelle de Michel Lang
1983 : Retenez moi... ou je fais un malheur ! de Michel Gérard
1983 : Biniky le Dragon Rose - Serendipity monogatari pure to no nakamatachi – TV, dessins animés - Chanson du générique
1983 : La Chambre des dames de Yannick Andreï - série TV, 10 x 52'
1983 : La Jeune femme en vert de Lazare Iglesis - téléfilm
1984 : La Septième Cible de Claude Pinoteau
1984 : Just The Way You Are d'Edouard Molinaro
1984 : Le Jumeau d'Yves Robert
1984 : La Tête dans le sac de Gérard Lauzier
1984 : Billet doux de Michel Berny - série TV, 6 x 60'
1984 : L'Homme de Suez de Christian-Jaque - série TV, 6 x 52'
1984 : L'Amour en héritage (Mistral's Daughter) de Douglas Hickox / Kevin Connor- série TV, 8 x 55'
1984 : La Bavure de Nicolas Ribowski – mini-série TV, 3 x 55'
1984 : Hello Einstein - Einstein de Lazare Iglesis - série TV, 6 x 55'
1984 : Châteauvallon de Paul Planchon et Serge Friedman - série TV, 26 x 52'
1985 : Les Rois du gag de Claude Zidi
1985 : Astérix et la surprise de César de Pierre et Gaëtan Brizzi - Film d'animation
1985 : Le Gaffeur de Serge Pénard
1985 : Drôle de samedi de Bay Okan
1985 : La Galette du roi de Jean-Michel Ribes
1985 : Les Mondes engloutis de Michel Gauthier - série animée TV 2 saisons 52 x 26'
1986 : Mort un dimanche de pluie de Joël Santoni
1986 : Les Fugitifs de Francis Veber
1986 : Asterix in Britain de Pino van Lamsweerde - Film d'animation
1986 :  de Gérard Oury
1986 : L'Été 36 d'Yves Robert - mini série TV, 2 x 90'
1986 : Claire de Lazare Iglesis - téléfilm
1986 : Le Tiroir secret de Michel Boisrond, Edouard Molinaro, Nadine Trintignant, Roger Guilloz... - série TV, 6 x 52'
1986 : Vive la Comédie de Jacques Fabbri, Jean-Luc Moreau, Paul Planchon, Jean-Pierre Bisson... - série TV, 10 x 90'
1986 : Tour de France de Philippe Monnier - mini-série TV, 2 x 52'
1987 : Le Moustachu de Dominique Chaussois
1987 : Cœurs croisés de Stéphanie de Mareuil
1987 : Promis... juré ! de Jacques Monnet
1987 : La Petite Allumeuse de Danièle Dubroux
1987 : L'Or noir de Lornac de Tony Flaadt - série TV
1987 : Rahan, le fils des âges farouches de Alain Sion - série de dessins animés TV, 26 x 26'
1987 : Nitwits de Nikolai van der Heyde
1988 : L'Etudiante de Claude Pinoteau
1988 : Corps z'à corps d'André Halimi
1988 : La Vouivre de Georges Wilson
1988 : Les Pique-assiettes de Dominique Giuliani, Gilles Amado, Jean-Luc Moreau... - série TV, 26 x 26'
1988 : M'as-tu vu ? de Jean-Michel Ribes et Eric Le Hung - série TV, 6 x 52'
1988 : Julien Fontanes Magistrat – Episode La Bête noire de Michel Berny –téléfilm
1989 : Il gèle en enfer de Jean-Pierre Mocky
1989 : Les Grandes Familles d'Edouard Molinaro – série TV, 4 x 84'
1989 : L'Eté de la révolution de Lazare Iglesis - téléfilm
1989 : Till We Meet Again - Le Secret de Château Valmont– de Charles Jarrott- série TV, 3 x 100'
1989 : Les Sœurs du Nord - SOS Disparus de Joël Santoni – téléfilm	
1989 : Le Retour d'Arsène Lupin de Michel Wyn, Jacques Besnard, Philippe Condroyer, Michel Boisrond...- série TV, 12 x 56'
1989 : Mésaventures de Elise Durupt - série TV, 161 x 26'
1989 : Intrigues de Maurice Dugowson et autres - série TV, 187 x 26'

 1990s 
1990 : La Gloire de mon père d'Yves Robert
1990 : Le Château de ma mère d'Yves Robert
1990 : La Pagaille de Pascal Thomas
1990 : La Belle anglaise 2 de Jacques Besnard - série TV, 6 x 52'
1990 : Night of the Fox - Le Complot du Renard de Charles Jarrott – téléfilms, 2 x 90'
1990 : Edouard et ses filles de Michel Lang - série TV, 6 x 55'
1990 : The Nighmare Years - Les Années infernales d'Anthony Page - série TV, 4 x 90'
1990 :  – Le Pavé du Gorille de Roger Hanin – téléfilm
1990 : Le Déjeuner de Sousceyrac de Lazare Iglesis – téléfilm
1990 : Passions - série TV, 57 x 26'
1990 : Côté cœur - série TV, 68 x 26'
1991 : La Neige et le Feu de Claude Pinoteau
1991 : Myster Mocky présente :La Méthode Barnol de Jean-Pierre Mocky - téléfilm
1991 : Myster Mocky présente :Dis-moi qui tu hais de Jean-Pierre Mocky – téléfilm
1991 : Myster Mocky présente :La Vérité qui tue de Jean-Pierre Mocky – téléfilm
1991 : La Totale! de Claude Zidi
1991 : La Montre, la croix et la manière - The Favour, the Watch and the Very Big Fish de Ben Lewin
1992 : Ville à vendre de Jean-Pierre Mocky
1992 : Coup de jeune de Xavier Gélin
1992 : Le Souper d'Edouard Molinaro
1992 :  d'Yves Robert
1992 : Les Coeurs brûlés de Jean Sagols - série TV
1992 : La Femme abandonnée d'Edouard Molinaro – téléfilm
1993 : Cuisine et Dépendances de Philippe Muyl
1993 : Le Mari de Léon de Jean-Pierre Mocky
1993 : La Soif de l'or de Gérard Oury
1993 : Mercedes mon amour de Bay Okan
1993 : Le Boeuf clandestin de Lazare Iglesis - téléfilm
1993 : Trois jours pour gagner de Michel Berny, Alain Nahum...- série TV, 13 x 27'
1994 : Montparnasse-Pondichéry d'Yves Robert
1994 : Bonsoir de Jean-Pierre Mocky
1994 : Cache Cash de Claude Pinoteau
1994 : L'Affaire de Sergio Gobbi
1994 : Les Yeux d'Hélène de Jean Sagols - série TV, 9 x 90'
1994 : Dazzle - Les Racines du Coeur de Richard A. Colla - mini-série TV, 2 x 90'
1995 : Les Sables mouvants de Paul Carpita
1995 : Les Nouveaux exploits d'Arsène Lupin d'Alain Nahum, Nicolas Ribowski - série TV
1996 : Le Jaguar de Francis Veber
1996 : Le Plus Beau Métier du monde de Gérard Lauzier
1996 : Les Palmes de monsieur Schutz de Claude Pinoteau
1996 : Faisons un rêve de Jean-Michel Ribes – téléfilm
1996 : Le Cheval de coeur de Charlotte Brandström – téléfilm
1996 : Berjac : Coup de maître de Jean-Michel Ribes – téléfilm
1996 : Berjac : Coup de théâtre de Jean-Michel Ribes - téléfilm
1997 : Soleil de Roger Hanin
1997 : Drôle de père de Charlotte Brandström – téléfilm
1997 : Maître da Costa – Episode : Le Doigt de Dieu de Bob Swaim - TV
1998 : Le Dîner de cons de Francis Veber
1998 : La Femme du Boulanger de Nicolas Ribowski - téléfilm
1999 : Le Schpountz de Gérard Oury
1999 : Le fils du Français de Gérard Lauzier
1999 : Le Monde à l'envers de Charlotte Brandström – mini-série TV, 2 x 90'
1999 : La Fiction des Guignols de Bruno Le Jean - téléfilm
1999 : Voleur de cœur de Patrick Jamain – téléfilm

 2000s 
2000 : La Vache et le Président de Philippe Muyl
2000 : La Trilogie Marseillaise : Marius, Fanny, César de Nicolas Ribowski – mini- série TV, 3 x 95'
2001 : Le Placard de Francis Veber
2001 : Le Monde à l'envers – Episode 3 : Le Secret d'Alice de Michaël Perrotta- TV
2002 : Les Homards de l'utopie - Marche et rêve ! de Paul Carpita
2002 : Clémy de Nicolas Ribowski - téléfilm
2002 : Action justice - Episode 1 : Une mère indigne d'Alain Schwartzstein - TV
2003 : Le Furet de Jean-Pierre Mocky
2003 : Action justice - Episode 2 : Un mauvais médecin de Jean-Pierre Igoux – TV
2003 : Action justice - Episode 3 : Déclaré coupable d'Alain Nahum - TV
2004 : Albert est méchant d'Hervé Palud
2004 : Le Président Ferrare d'Alain Nahum - série TV
2004 : Touristes, Oh yes ! de Jean-Pierre Mocky
2005 : Grabuge de Jean-Pierre Mocky
2005 : Les Ballets écarlates de Jean-Pierre Mocky
2005 : Le Bénévole de Jean-Pierre Mocky
2006 : Le Temps des porte-plumes de Daniel Duval
2006 : Le Deal de Jean-Pierre Mocky
2007 : 13, French Street de Jean-Pierre Mocky
2007 : Myster Mocky présente de Jean-Pierre Mocky - série TV:
 Le Diable en Embuscade avec Jean-Hugues Anglade et B. Putzulu.
 Le Farceur avec Michel Galabru et Charles Berling.
 Un Eléphant dans un Magasin de Porcelaine avec Micheline Presle et Jean-Pierre Mocky.
 Service rendu avec Richard Bohringer et Smadi Wolfman.
 La Clinique Opale avec Didier Bourdon et Tom Novembre.
 La Cellule Insonorisée avec Claude Brasseur et Patricia Barzyk.
2008 : Myster Mocky présente de Jean-Pierre Mocky - série TV :
 Témoins de Choix avec Lorant Deutsch et Dominique Pinon.
 Le Jour de l'Exécution avec Michel Piccoli et Frédéric Diefenthal.
 Dans le Lac avec Arielle Dombasle, Stanislas Merhar, Aurélien Wiik.
 Morts sur commande avec Richard Bohringer et Jean-Pierre Mocky.
 Chantage à Domicile avec Laurent Gerra, Rufus et Henry Guibet.
 L'Energumène - Symbole d'autorité avec Régis Laspalès.
2008 : Climax de Frédéric Sojcher - court métrage
2009 : Colère de Jean-Pierre Mocky – téléfilm
2009 : Myster Mocky présente de Jean-Pierre Mocky - série TV:Le Voisin de cellule avec Jean-Paul Rouve et Richard Bohringer.De Quoi Mourir de rire avec Louise Monot, Stanislas Merhar et Philippe Chevalier.Sauvetage avec Richard Anconina, Bernard Lecoq et Zinédine Soualem.Un Risque à courir avec Gaspard Ulliel, Elsa Zylberstein.Une si gentille serveuse avec Micheline Presle, Zoé Félix et Aurélien Wiik.Haine mortelle avec Pierre Mondy et Dominique Pinon.
2010 : Les Insomniaques de Jean-Pierre Mocky
2010 : Crédit pour tous de Jean-Pierre Mocky
2010 : Myster Mocky présente de Jean-Pierre Mocky - série TV:
 L'Aide avec Cristiana Reali, Bruno Todeschini et Patricia Barzyk.
 La Cadillac avec Arielle Dombasle et Frédéric Diefenthal.
 Martha in Memoriam avec Mathieu Demy, Virginie Ledoyen et François Vincentelli.
 Meurtre entre amies avec Victoria Abril et Dominique Lavanant.
 L'Ultime bobine avec Stomy Bugzy et Richard Gotainer.
 La Voix de sa conscience avec Michèle Bernier, Daniel Russo.
2011 : Le dossier Toroto de Jean-Pierre Mocky
2011 : Calomnies de Jean-Pierre Mocky
2011 : Hitler à Hollywood (H/H) de Frédéric Sojcher

 Operas and stage works 
1970: Fantômas, opéra de chambre d'après l'œuvre de Robert Desnos réalisé par Eve Griliquez 
1971: Volpone, musique de scène et de ballet pour la Comédie-Française, mise en scène de Gérard Vergez
1986: Alcazar de Paris, musique et chansons de la revue du cabaret Alaczar de Frantz Salieri
2000, 2001, 2003, 2004: Election Miss France, musiques, ballets et chansons (2000, 2001, 2003, 2004)
2007: Marius et Fanny, opéra en deux actes d'après l'œuvre de Marcel Pagnol
2008: Les Aventures de Rabbi Jacob, comédie musicale de Patrick Timsit (2008)

 Symphonic works based on film soundtracks 

  L'As des As - Ouverture (2001–2002)
 La Boum - suite d'orchestre (1991)
 La Gloire de mon Père, Le Château de ma mère - suite d'orchestre (1991–2006) Habanera, Les Vacances, Isabelle, Le Parc Borelli, Massalia Rag, Valse d'Augustine
 Le Grand Blond avec une chaussure noire - Danse Roumaine (1991)
 Michel Strogoff - suite d'orchestre (1995) -  Thème de Nadia, Danse Tartare 
 Les Aventures de Rabbi Jacob - Danses Hassidiques (1996)
 Le Bal, pour trompette et orchestre (1994)
 La Course à l'échalote - suite d'orchestre (1995)
 La Dérobade  (Solitude) (1995)
 Le Jaguar (Thème de l'Aventure) (1999)
 Les Aventures de David Balfour (La Légende de David) (2006)
 Le Placard  (2001)
 La Chèvre (La Cabra) pour kena ou naï et orchestre (2002)
 Les Compères (1991)
 Les Fugitifs - suite d'orchestre (1991)
 La Boum 2 - suite d'orchestre (1998)
 Diva (Promenade  sentimentale ) version orchestrale (2002)
 Un Eléphant, ça trompe énormément  (Hello Marilyn) (1991)
 L'Eté  36 – suite d'orchestre (1995)
 L'Amour en héritage - version orchestrale (1996)
 Châteauvallon – version orchestrale (1999)
 Les Cœurs brûlés - version orchestrale (1996)
 Le Bal des casse-pieds (Les Casse-pieds) – pour solistes de jazz et orchestre (1999)
 Le Bal des casse-pieds (Les Casse-pieds) – version orchestrale (1999)
 Salut l'Artiste (Yves et Danièle) pour solistes de jazz et orchestre (1999)
 L'Aile ou la Cuisse  (Concerto gastronomique) pour solistes de jazz et orchestre (2003)
 Le Père Noël au Paradis - suite basée sur les musiques des films : Le Père Noël est une ordure, Nous irons tous au Paradis, pour solistes de jazz et orchestre (1996–1999)
 Le Dîner de cons, pour solistes de jazz et orchestre (2002)

 Works for soloists and orchestra 
 Oblique, pour violoncelle et orchestre  à cordes (1969)
 Concerto pour Euphonium et orchestre (commande du Festival et Concours international de Tuba de Guebwiller, 1997)
 Concerto Ibérique, pour trompette et orchestre (création lors du Concours international de cuivres de la ville de Narbonne, 1998)
 Concerto de Berlin, pour violon et orchestre 
 version du film La 7ème Cible (1984) – env. 9'
 version intégrale (2001) – env.29'

 Vocal, Choral and symphonic 
 Eh bien ! Dansez maintenant, divertissement d'après Les Fables de Jean de La Fontaine pour Récitant et orchestre symphonique (2006)
 Cantate 1209, pour Récitant, Soprano, Chœurs d'enfants et orchestre (2009)
 Reality du film La Boum, pour voix de ténor et orchestre (2001)
 L'Amour en héritage  (Only Love), pour soprano et orchestre (1996)
 Your Eyes du film La Boum 2, pour soprano et orchestre  (1998)
 Les Cœurs brûlés, pour soprano et orchestre (1996)
 Divine du film Diva  pour soprano et orchestre (1996)
 Air de la Wally du film Diva (A.Catalani, argt.V.Cosma), pour soprano et orchestre (1980)
 You call it Love du film L'Etudiante pour soprano et orchestre (2002)
 Eternity du film La Vouivre  pour soprano et orchestre (2002)

 Military and Concert Band music with or without soloists 
 Concerto pour Euphonium et orchestre d'harmonie (commande du Festival et Concours international de Tuba de Guebwiller, 1997)
 Concerto Ibérique, pour trompette et orchestre d'harmonie (création lors du Concours international de cuivres de la ville de Narbonne, 1998)
 La Boum - suite pour orchestre d'harmonie (2010)
 La Gloire de mon Père, Le Château de ma Mère  - suite pour orchestre d'harmonie (2009) - Habanera, Les Vacances, Isabelle, Valse d'Augustine
 Le Grand Blond avec une chaussure noire - Danse Roumaine (2010)
 Michel Strogoff - suite pour orchestre d'harmonie (2008) - Thème de Nadia, Danse Tartare
 Les Aventures de Rabbi Jacob - Danses Hassidiques (2007)
 L'Aile ou la Cuisse - Concerto gastronomique (2007)
 Les Saxs Brothers du film Nous irons tous au Paradis pour Quintette de saxophones, Piano, Contrebasse et Batterie (2008)

 Chamber music, Pianoforte reductions 
 Courts métrages Quintette de cuivres (commande du Festival et Concours  international de Narbonne, 1996)
 9 Recueils de Musiques de Films,  pour instruments solistes et accompagnement de piano - Flûte, e, Hautbois, Saxophone alto, Cor, Euphonium, Trompette, Trombone, Violon (2011)
 Concerto pour Euphonium et orchestre, réduction pour Euphonium et Piano (1997)
 9 Recueils de Musiques de Films,  pour instruments solistes et accompagnement de piano - Flûte, Clarinet, Hautbois, Saxophone alto, Cor, Euphonium, Trompette, Trombone, Violon (2011)
 Concerto Ibérique,  réduction pour Trompette et Piano  (1998)
 Concerto de Berlin, réduction pour  Violon et Piano 
 version du film La 7ème Cible – env. 9' (1984 – rev.1999)
 version intégrale  – env.29' (2002)
 Eh bien ! Dansez maintenant – divertissement d'après des Fables de Jean de La Fontaine – partition pour Récitant et Piano (2006)
 Marius et Fanny, réduction pour  Piano et Chant  (2007)
 Cantate 1209, réduction pour Piano, Récitant, Soprano, Chœurs d'enfants (2009)

 Pianoforte music 
 Les Musiques de Films de Vladimir Cosma, Volumes 1, 2, 3, 4  (1982–1990)
 La Gloire de mon père – Le Château de ma mère, recueil pour piano (1990)

 Vocal music and songs 
 2 Recueils pour voix et piano 
 Vladimir Cosma – Les plus belles chansons  Cinéma & Télévision – volume 1 (1996)
 Vladimir Cosma – Les plus belles chansons  Cinéma & Télévision – volume 2 (1996)

Egalement une centaine de chansons parmi lesquelles :
 Reality, du film La Boum, interprétée par Richard Sanderson (1980)
 L'Amour en héritage (Only Love), interprétée par Nana Mouskouri (1984)
 Destinée, des films Le Père Noël est une ordure  et  Les Sous-doués en vacances, interprétée par Guy Marchand (1982)
 Puissance et Gloire, de la série TV Châteauvallon, interprétée par Herbert Léonard (1985)
 Your Eyes, du film  La Boum 2, interprétée par Cook Da Books (1982)
 Le Ciel, La Terre et l'eau, du film Alexandre Le Bienheureux, interprétée par Isabelle Aubret (1968)
 Un Souvenir heureux de la série TV Le tiroir secret, interprétée par Diane Dufresne (1986)
 You call it Love, du film L'Etudiante, interprétée par Karoline Krüger (1988)
 My Life, de la série TV  Till we meet again, interprétée par Mireille Mathieu (1989)
 Je n'ai pas dit mon dernier mot d'amour, du film La Dérobade, interprétée par Nicole Croisille (1979)
 L'Année prochaine si tout va bien, interprétée par Sofie Kremen (1981)
 Ballade de Clérambard, du film  Clérambard, interprétée par Marie Laforêt (1969)
 Pour l'Amour, de la série TV La Chambre des Dames, interprétée par Annick Thoumazeau (1983)
 Les Cœurs brûlés, interprétée par Nicole Croisille (1992)
 Laisse-moi rêver, du film La Neige et le feu, interprétée par Lara Fabian (1991)
 Les Mondes Engloutis, interprétée par les Mini Star (1985)
 Maybe you're wrong, du film La Boum 2, interprétée par Freddie Meyer (1982)
 Go on for ever, du film La Boum, interprétée par Richard Sanderson et Chantal Curtis (1980)
 Get it together, du film Inspecteur La Bavure, interprétée par Chantal Curtis (1980)

 Awards 
1981: Disques d'Or et de Platine pour les B.O.F. : Diva, La Boum.
1981: César Award de la meilleure musique de film pour Diva.
1982: Prix du Festival de Moscou de la musique du film pour Diva.
1982: Disques d'Or et de Platine pour la B.O.F. : La Boum 2.
1983: Grand Prix du Disque de la Musique de films (Sacem) pour l'ensemble de son œuvre à Cannes.
1984: César Award de la meilleure musique de film pour Le Bal.
1985: Disques d'Or et de Platine pour les B.O.F.: L'Amour en Héritage, Les Mondes Engloutis, Châteauvallon.
1986: 7 d'Or de la meilleure musique pour la télévision avec le film en deux parties : L'été 36.
1986: Nommé au grade de Commandeur des Arts et des Lettres.
1988: Disque d'Or pour la B.O.F. de L'Etudiante.
1990: Grand Prix Sacem de l'''Œuvre musicale audiovisuelle.
1991: 7 d'Or de la meilleure musique pour la télévision.
1995: Médaille d'honneur de  la Ville de Beauvais.
2000: Médaille d'honneur du Conseil Général de l'Yonne.
2001: Prix Philip Award de Varsovie («Greatest Creation accomplishment in Europeen film music»).
2003: Grand Prix Sacem de  la Musique de Film.
2004: Nommé Grand Officier du Mérite Culturel Roumain.
2004: Nommé Chevalier dans l'Ordre National de la Légion d'Honneur.
2005: Lumière d'Honneur – Festival La Ciotat, Berceau du Cinéma.
2006: Médaille d'honneur de la Ville et Parrain de l'Ecole Municipale de Musique (Vandoeuvre les Nancy).
2007: Hommage et Médaille d'honneur de la Ville de Cabourg.
2008: Trophée  «Phenix Award saluant l'ensemble de sa carrière (Festival du Film à Spa en Belgique.)
2009: Hommage et Médaille d'honneur de la Ville de Béziers.
2010: Prix Henri Langlois de la Cinémathèque Française 2010.

References

Alain Lacombe et Claude Rocle, La Musique du Film – Vladimir Cosma (Editions Francis van de Velde, Paris, 1979)Who is Who in Europe – Dictionnaire Biographique – Vladimir Cosma (Ed.Servi-Tech, 5ème éd., Belgique, 1983)
Steve Harris, Film and Television Composers : An International Discography – Vladimir Cosma (Mc Farland & Company Inc., Publishers, USA, 1992)
Théodore Baker, Nicolas Slonimsky, Dictionnaire Biographique des Musiciens – Vladimir Cosma (Ed.Robert Laffont, Paris, 1995)
Stéphane Lerouge, Cent ans de cinéma - Vladimir Cosma. Du Grand Blond à Diva, l'autre Cosma paru dans NOTES N° 14 (Ed.SACEM / SDRM, Paris, 1995)Enciclopedia Români in stiinta si cultura occidentala – Vladimir Cosma (Los Angeles, CA90027 USA,  1992 ; 2ème éd., 1996)Viorel Cosma, Muzicieni din România – Vladimir Cosma (Editura Muzicala, Bucuresti, 1999)The New Grove Dictionary of Music and Musicians – Vladimir Cosma (Macmillan Publishers Limited, 2nd éd., 2001)Vincent Perrot, B.O.F. Musiques et compositeurs du cinéma français – Vladimir Cosma (Dreamland éditeur, Paris, 2002)Lionel Pons, Le style de Vladimir Cosma, des studios à la scène, dans Marius et Fanny  (Ed. Actes Sud, 2007)Vladimir Cosma comme au cinéma, Entretiens avec Vincent Perrot (Ed.Hors Collection, Paris, 2009) 
Lionel Pons, Vladimir Cosma l'imagier avec des analyses musicologiques incluses dans le coffret discographique Vladimir Cosma – 40 Bandes Originales pour 40 Films (Ed.Larghetto Music, Pays Bas, 2009)Who is Who in France – Dictionnaire biographique – Vladimir Cosma (Ed.Laffitte-Hébrard, 41ème éd., Paris, 2010)
Lionel Pons, Vladimir Cosma, prima la musica, avec des analyses musicologiques incluses dans le coffret discographique Vladimir Cosma, vol.2, 51 Bandes Originales pour 51 Films'' (Ed.Larghetto Music, Pays Bas, 2010)

External links
 
  
 Interview with SCORE magazine
 Interview with Vladimir Cosma 
 
 

1940 births
Living people
Concert band composers
Romanian composers
Romanian film score composers
Romanian musicians
Romanian conductors (music)
Male conductors (music)
Best Music Score Golden Boll Award winners
École Normale de Musique de Paris alumni
French male conductors (music)
French film score composers
French male film score composers
Romanian emigrants to France
20th-century French male violinists
Musicians from Bucharest
21st-century French conductors (music)
21st-century French male violinists